Fynn Otto (born 8 March 2002) is a German professional footballer who plays as a centre-back or defensive midfielder for Eintracht Frankfurt II.

Early life and education
Born in Giessen, Otto was educated at the Burggymnasium in Friedberg in der Wetterau.

Club career
Otto played youth football for TSV Ostheim and SV Nieder-Weisel before joining Eintracht Frankfurt's youth academy in 2014. In January 2020, Otto signed a three-year professional contract with the club, active from summer 2020. On 4 August 2021, it was announced that Otto had joined 3. Liga club Hallescher FC on a season-long loan.

International career
Otto made 9 appearances for Germany at under-16 level, scoring one goal. He was later called up for the under-18 team, but withdrew through injury.

Style of play
Otto can play as a centre-back or as a defensive midfielder.

References

External links

2002 births
Living people
German footballers
Sportspeople from Giessen
Footballers from Hesse
Association football central defenders
Association football midfielders
Eintracht Frankfurt players
Hallescher FC players
Eintracht Frankfurt II players
3. Liga players
Germany youth international footballers